Douglas Channel is one of the principal inlets of the British Columbia Coast. The actual length of the fjord's waterway includes waters between there and the open waters of the Hecate Strait outside the coastal archipelago, comprising another  for in total.

Geography
The Kitimat River flows into the Kitimat Arm portion of Douglas Channel. The channel is named in honour of Sir James Douglas, the first governor of the Colony of British Columbia.

South of Hawkesbury is Varney Passage, which has a sidechannel, Ursula Passage.

Industry

Douglas Channel is a busy shipping artery because of the methanol import terminal (formerly methanol production and export) and the aluminum smelter at Kitimat, as bauxite must be shipped in and smelted aluminum shipped out. Recently announced (2005) plans will see a major expansion of the port of Kitimat as a container and bulk resources port, augmenting the port capacity of the British Columbia's North Coast currently a monopoly of the city of nearby Prince Rupert.

The methanol production and export plant closed in 2006.

Douglas Channel will be subject due to new sensitive ship traffic when the LNG Canada natural gas storage and liquefaction terminal will be completed and operational, which is estimated to be in 2025. The project, led by an liquefied natural gas (LNG) subsidiary of Royal Dutch Shell and several Asian partners and finally approved on October 1, 2018, will see large LNG carrier ships loading liquefied natural gas at the future Kitimat LNG terminal, to carry it to export destinations, mainly in Asia.

The Gardner Canal is important for being the location of the Kemano Generating Station of the Nechako Diversion, which was built to supply power for Kitimat. The head of the Gardner Canal, also, is the mouth of the Kitlope River, a major wildlife and wilderness preserve and area of outstanding natural beauty and harsh weather.

References

Fjords of British Columbia
North Coast of British Columbia
Channels of British Columbia